Vlădiceni may refer to several villages in Romania:

 Vlădiceni, a village in Tomești Commune, Iași County
 Vlădiceni, a village in Bârgăuani Commune, Neamț County